The 1999 Boston Red Sox season was the 99th season in the franchise's Major League Baseball history. The Red Sox finished second in the American League East with a record of 94 wins and 68 losses, four games behind the New York Yankees, who went on to win the World Series. The Red Sox qualified for the postseason as the AL wild card, and defeated the American League Central champion Cleveland Indians in the ALDS. The Red Sox then lost to the Yankees in the ALCS.

Pedro Martínez won the American League Cy Young Award, becoming the second pitcher to win the award in both leagues. Additionally, Jimy Williams was named the American League Manager of the Year.

Offseason 
 November 16, 1998: José Offerman was signed as a free agent by the Red Sox.
 November 20, 1998: Purchased Tomo Ohka from the Yokohama Bay Stars.
 December 11, 1998: Mark Portugal was signed as a free agent by the Red Sox.
 December 18, 1998: Brian Daubach was signed as a free agent by the Red Sox.
 December 19, 1998: Mark Guthrie was signed as a free agent by the Red Sox.
 January 11, 1999: Pat Rapp was signed as a free agent by the Red Sox.
 March 11, 1999: Ramón Martínez was signed as a free agent by the Red Sox.
 March 30, 1999: Midre Cummings was released by the Red Sox.

Regular season

Season standings

Record vs. opponents

Opening Day Line Up 

Source

All-Star Game 

The 1999 Major League Baseball All-Star Game was the 70th playing of the midsummer classic between the all-stars of the American League (AL) and National League (NL). Red Sox legend Ted Williams threw the ceremonial first pitch. Three members of the Red Sox played in the game. Pitcher Pedro Martínez and shortstop Nomar Garciaparra were starters, while second baseman José Offerman was a reserve. The game, won by the American League 4-1, was held on July 13, 1999, at Fenway Park.

Notable transactions 
 June 2, 1999: Casey Fossum was drafted by the Red Sox in the 1st Round of the 1999 Major League Baseball Draft. Player signed July 19, 1999.
 June 2, 1999: Lew Ford was drafted by the Red Sox in the 12th round of the 1999 Major League Baseball Draft. Player signed June 7, 1999.
 July 26, 1999: Robert Ramsay was traded by the Red Sox to the Seattle Mariners for Butch Huskey.
 July 31, 1999: Mike Maroth was traded by the Red Sox to the Detroit Tigers for Bryce Florie.
 August 24, 1999: Dave Benham and Mike Matthews were traded by the Red Sox to the St. Louis Cardinals for Kent Mercker.
 August 31, 1999: Mark Guthrie and a player to be named later (Cole Liniak) were traded by the Red Sox to the Chicago Cubs for Rod Beck.
 September 27, 1999: Mark Portugal was released by the Red Sox.

Roster

Player statistics

Batting

Starters by position 
Note: Pos = Position; G = Games played; AB = At bats; H = Hits; Avg. = Batting average; HR = Home runs; RBI = Runs batted in

Other batters 
Note: G = Games played; AB = At bats; H = Hits; Avg. = Batting average; HR = Home runs; RBI = Runs batted in

Pitching

Starting rotation 
Note: G = Games pitched (GS) = Games started; IP = Innings pitched; W = Wins; L = Losses; ERA = Earned run average; SO = Strikeouts

Relief, spot starters, and other pitchers 
Note: G = Games pitched (GS) = Games started; IP = Innings pitched; W = Wins; L = Losses; SV = Saves; ERA = Earned run average; SO = Strikeouts

Source

Playoffs

Division Series 

Boston wins the series, 3-2

League Championship Series 

New York wins the series, 4-1

Game log 

|- style="text-align:center; background-color:#bfb;"
| 1 || April 5 || @ Royals  || 5–3 || P. Martínez (1–0) || Appier (0–1) || Gordon (1) || Kauffman Stadium || 40,257 || 1–0 || W1
|- style="text-align:center; background-color:#bfb;"
| 2 || April 7 || @ Royals  || 6–0 || Saberhagen (1–0) || Rosado (0–1) || — || Kauffman Stadium || 13,903  || 2–0 || W2
|- style="text-align:center; background-color:#bfb;"
| 3 || April 8 || @ Royals  || 4–1 || Wakefield (1–0)  || Suppan (0–1) || Gordon (2) || Kauffman Stadium || 13,356 || 3–0 || W3
|- style="text-align:center; background-color:#bfb;"
| 4 || April 9 || @ Devil Rays  || 4–1 || Portugal (1–0)  || Arrojo (0–1)  || — || Tropicana Field || 40,525 || 4–0 || W4
|- style="text-align:center; background-color:#bfb;"
| 5 || April 10 || @ Devil Rays || 5–3 || P. Martínez (2–0) || Santana (0–1) || Gordon (3) || Tropicana Field || 28,552 || 5–0 || W5
|- style="text-align:center; background-color:#fbb;"
| 6 || April 11 || @ Devil Rays  || 4–5 || Aldred (1–0) || Lowe (0–1) || Hernández (2) || Tropicana Field || 23,404 || 5–1 || L1
|- style="text-align:center; background-color:#bfb;"
| 7 || April 13 || White Sox  || 6–0 || Saberhagen (2–0) || Parque (1–1) || — || Fenway Park || 31,874 || 6–1 || W1
|- style="text-align:center; background-color:#fbb;"
| 8 || April 15 || White Sox  || 0–4  || Snyder (1–1) || P. Martínez (2–1) || — || Fenway Park || 22,461 || 6–2 || L1
|- style="text-align:center; background-color:#fbb"
| 9 || April 16 || Devil Rays || 6–2 || Rekar (1–0) || Wakefield (1–1) || — || Fenway Park || 18,809 || 6–3 || L2
|- style="text-align:center; background-color:#bfb"
| 10 || April 17 || Devil Rays || 8–5 || Portugal (2–0) || Saunders (1–2) || — || Fenway Park || 26,799 || 7–3 || W1
|- style="text-align:center; background-color:#fbb"
| 11 || April 18 || Devil Rays || 1–5 || Witt (2–0) || Rapp (0–1) || — || Fenway Park || 27,589 || 7–4 || L1
|- style="text-align:center; background-color:#fbb"
| 12 || April 19 || Devil Rays || 5–4 || Arrojo (1–1) || Saberhagen (2–1) || Hernández (4) || Fenway Park || 33,167 || 7–5 || L2
|- style="text-align:center; background-color:#bfb"
| 13 || April 20 || @ Athletics || 1–0 || P. Martínez (3–1) || Weaver (1–1) || Lowe (1) || Tiger Stadium || 12,558 || 8–5 || W1
|- style="text-align:center; background-color:#fbb"
| 14 || April 21 || @ Tigers || 2–9 || Moehler (2–2) || Wakefield (1–2) || — || Tiger Stadium || 13,049 || 8–6 || L1
|- style="text-align:center; background-color:#fbb"
| 15 || April 22 || @ Tigers || 0–1 || Thompson (2–2) || Portugal (2–1) || Jones (2) || Tiger Stadium || 32,975 || 8–7 || L2
|- style="text-align:center; background-color:#fbb;"
| 16 || April 23 || Indians || 6–7 || Karsay (2–1) || Corsi (0–1) || Jackson (3) || Fenway Park || 29,921 || 8–8 || L3
|- style="text-align:center; background-color:#bfb;"
| 17 || April 24 || Indians || 9–4 || Harikkala (1–0) || DeLucia (0–1) || — || Fenway Park || 29,481 || 9–8 || W1
|- style="text-align:center; background-color:#bfb;"
| 18 || April 25 || Indians || 3–2 || P. Martínez (4–1) || Shuey (2–1) || — || Fenway Park || 30,472 || 10–8 || W2
|- style="text-align:center; background-color:#fbb;"
| 19 || April 26 || @ Twins || 2–6 || Radke (2–2) || Wakefield (1–3) || Trombley (1) || Metrodome || 9,674 || 10–9 || L1
|- style="text-align:center; background-color:#fbb;"
| 20 || April 27 || @ Twins  || 5–6 || Guardado (1–1) || Corsi (0–2) || Aguilera (4) || Metrodome || 10,681 || 10–10 || L2
|- style="text-align:center; background-color:#bfb;"
| 21 || April 28 || @ Twins || 9–4 || Rapp (1–1) || Lincoln (0–4) || — || Metrodome || 11,097 || 11–10 || W1
|- style="text-align:center; background-color:#fbb;"
| 22 || April 30 || @ Athletics  || 9–13 || Mathews (3–0) || Lowe (0–2) || — || Network Associates Coliseum || 10,063 || 11–11 || L1
|-

|- style="text-align:center; background-color:#bfb"
| 23 || May 1 || @ Athletics || 7–2 || P. Martínez (5–1) || Heredia (1–2) || — || Network Associates Coliseum || 30,353 || 12–11 || W1
|- style="text-align:center; background-color:#fbb"
| 24 || May 2 || @ Athletics || 5–7 || Jones (1–0) || Harikkala (1–1) || Taylor (6) || Network Associates Coliseum || 17,388 || 12–12 || L1 
|- style="text-align:center; background-color:#fbb;"
| 25 || May 3 || @ Athletics || 11–12 (10)|| Mathews (4–0) || Gross (0–1) || — || Network Associates Coliseum || 8,221 || 12–13 || L2 
|- style="text-align:center; background-color:#fbb;"
| 26 || May 5 || Rangers || 3–8 || Helling (3–3) || Rapp (1–2) || — || Fenway Park || 20,960 || 12–14 || L3
|- style="text-align:center; background-color:#bfb;"
| 27 || May 6 || Rangers || 3–2 || Cormier (1–0) || Sele (3–3) || Wakefield (1) || Fenway Park || 21,412 || 13–14 || W1 
|- style="text-align:center; background-color:#bfb;"
| 28 || May 7 || Angels || 6–0 || P. Martínez (6–1) || Olivares (3–3) || — || Fenway Park || 32,220 || 14–14 || W2 
|- style="text-align:center; background-color:#bfb;"
| 29 || May 8 || Angels || 6–1 || Peña (1–0) || Belcher (1–3) || Lowe (2) || Fenway Park || 29,385 || 15–14 || W3 
|- style="text-align:center; background-color:#bfb;"
| 30 || May 9 || Angels || 4–2 || Portugal (3–1) || Hill (1–2) || Wakefield (2) || Fenway Park || 23,710 || 16–14 || W4 
|- style="text-align:center; background-color:#bfb;"
| 31 || May 10 || Mariners || 12–4 || Wasdin (1–0) || Hinchliffe (0–2) || — || Fenway Park || 21,660 || 17–14 || W5
|- style="text-align:center; background-color:#fbb;"
| 32 || May 11 || Mariners || 5–8 || Moyer (2–4) || Wakefield (1–4) || — || Fenway Park || 24,416 || 17–15 || L1 
|- style="text-align:center; background-color:#bfb;"
| 33 || May 12 || Mariners || 9–2 ||P. Martínez (7–1) || Suzuki (0–2) || — || Fenway Park || 28,177 || 18–15 || W1 
|- style="text-align:center; background-color:#bfb;"
| 34 || May 14 || @ Blue Jays || 5–0 || Peña (2–0) || Wells (4–3) || — || SkyDome || 22,186 || 19–15 || W2 
|- style="text-align:center; background-color:#bfb"
| 35 || May 15 || @ Blue Jays || 6–5 || Wasdin (2–0) || Plesac (0–3) || Gordon (4) || SkyDome || 24,579 || 20–15 || W3 
|- style="text-align:center; background-color:#fbb"
| 36 || May 16 || @ Blue Jays || 6–9 || Lloyd (3–1) || Gross (0–2) || — || SkyDome || 21,094 || 20–16 || L1 
|- style="text-align:center; background-color:#bfb"
| 37 || May 17 || @ Blue Jays || 8–7 || Wasdin (3–0) || Lloyd (3–2) || — || SkyDome || 20,395 || 21–16 || W1 
|- style="text-align:center; background-color:#bfb"
| 38 || May 18 || Yankees || 6–3 || P. Martínez (8–1) || Cone (4–2) || Gordon (5) || Fenway Park || 33,620 || 22–16 || W2 
|- style="text-align:center; background-color:#bfb"
| 39 || May 19 || Yankees || 6–0 || Rose (1–0) || Irabu (1–2) || — || Fenway Park || 32,091 || 23–16 || W3
|- style="text-align:center; background-color:#fbb"
| 40 || May 20 || Yankees || 1–3 || Hernández (4–4) || Portugal (3–2) || Rivera (11) || Fenway Park || 33,139 || 23–17 || L1
|- style="text-align:center; background-color:#bfb"
| 41 || May 21 || Blue Jays || 5–2 || Rapp (2–2) || Escobar (3–2) || — || Fenway Park || 27,284 || 24–17 || W1 
|- style="text-align:center; background-color:#bfb;"
| 42 || May 22 || Blue Jays || 6–4 || Wakefield (2–4) || Carpenter (3–4) || Gordon (6) || Fenway Park || 32,038 || 25–17 || W2 
|- style="text-align:center; background-color:#bfb;"
| 43 || May 23 || Blue Jays || 10–8 || P. Martínez (9–1) || Hentgen (4–2) || Gordon (7) || Fenway Park || 28,559 || 26–17 || W3 
|- style="text-align:center; background-color:#bbb"
| — || May 24 || @ Yankees  || colspan=8|Postponed (rain). Makeup date May 27.
|- style="text-align:center; background-color:#bfb;"
| 44 || May 25 || @ Yankees || 5–2 || Rose (2–0) || Irabu (1–3) || Gordon (8) || Yankee Stadium || 37,715 || 27–17 || W4 
|- style="text-align:center; background-color:#fbb"
| 45 || May 26 || @ Yankees || 3–8 || Hernández (5–4) || Portugal (3–3) || Rivera (12) || Yankee Stadium || 45,800 || 27–18 || L1 
|- style="text-align:center; background-color:#fbb"
| 46 || May 27 || @ Yankees || 1–4 || Clemens (4–0) || Rapp (2–3) || Rivera (13) || Yankee Stadium || 55,671 || 27–19 || L2 
|- style="text-align:center; background-color:#bfb"
| 47 || May 28 || @ Indians || 12–5 || Wakefield (3–4) || Wright (4–3) || Lowe (3) || Jacobs Field || 43,287 || 28–19 || W1 
|- style="text-align:center; background-color:#bfb"
| 48 || May 29 || @ Indians || 4–2 || P. Martínez (10–1) || Colón (6–2) || Gordon (9) || Jacobs Field || 43,255 || 29–19 || W2 
|- style="text-align:center; background-color:#bfb"
| 49 || May 30 || @ Indians || 4–2 || Rose (3–0) || Gooden (2–2) || Gordon (10) || Jacobs Field || 43,207 || 30–19 || W3 
|- style="text-align:center; background-color:#bfb"
| 50 || May 31 || Tigers || 8–7 || Wasdin (4–0) || Anderson (1–1) || Gordon (11) || Fenway Park || 27,883 || 31–19 || W4 
|-

|- style="text-align:center; background-color:#bfb;"
| 51 || June 1 || Tigers || 5–4 || Wasdin (5–0) || Brocail (1–2) || Lowe (4) || Fenway Park || 26,456 || 32–19 || W5 
|- style="text-align:center; background-color:#fbb;"
| 52 || June 2 || Tigers || 2–4 || Thompson (5–6) || Wakefield (3–5) || Jones (9) || Fenway Park || 22,194 || 32–20 || L1
|- style="text-align:center; background-color:#bfb;"
| 53 || June 4 || Braves || 5–1 || P. Martínez (11–1) || Glavine (3–7) || — || Fenway Park || 33,411 || 33–20 || W1
|- style="text-align:center; background-color:#fbb"
| 54 || June 5 || Braves || 5–6 || Maddux (5–3) || Gordon (0–1) || Rocker (11) || Fenway Park || 32,793 || 33–21 || L1
|- style="text-align:center; background-color:#fbb"
| 55 || June 6 || Braves || 2–3 (10)|| Seánez (4–0) || Portugal (3–4) || Rocker (12) || Fenway Park || 32,184 || 33–22 || L2 
|- style="text-align:center; background-color:#fbb"
| 56 || June 7 || @ Expos || 2–8 || Pavano (4–5) || Saberhagen (2–2) || — || Olympic Stadium || 7,003 || 33–23 || L3 
|- style="text-align:center; background-color:#fbb"
| 57 || June 8 || @ Expos || 1–5 || Smith (1–0) || Wakefield (3–6) || — || Olympic Stadium || 7,233 || 33–24 || L4
|- style="text-align:center; background-color:#fbb"
| 58 || June 9 || @ Expos || 1–13 || Thurman (2–3) || P. Martínez (11–2) || — || Olympic Stadium || 19,012 || 33–25 || L5 
|- style="text-align:center; background-color:#bfb"
| 59 || June 11 || @ Mets || 3–2 (12)|| Corsi (1–2) || Franco (0–2) || Wasdin (1) || Shea Stadium || 36,700 || 34–25 || W1
|- style="text-align:center; background-color:#fbb;"
| 60 || June 12 || @ Mets || 2–4 || Leiter (4–5) || Rapp (2–4) || Franco (15) || Shea Stadium || 43,819 || 34–26 || L1
|- style="text-align:center; background-color:#fbb;"
| 61 || June 13 || @ Mets || 4–5 || Hershiser (6–5) || Portugal (3–5) || Wendell (2) || Shea Stadium || 46,473 || 34–27 || L2
|- style="text-align:center; background-color:#bfb;"
| 62 || June 14 || Twins || 4–3 || Wasdin (6–0) || Trombley (1–3) || — || Fenway Park || 30,099 || 35–27 || W1
|- style="text-align:center; background-color:#bfb;"
| 63 || June 15 || Twins || 4–2 || P. Martínez (12–2) || Milton (2–6) || Wakefield (3) || Fenway Park || 31,805 || 36–27 || W2 
|- style="text-align:center; background-color:#bfb;"
| 64 || June 16 || Twins || 5–1 || Rose (4–0) || Perkins (1–4) || Guthrie (1) || Fenway Park || 30,085 || 37–27 || W3
|- style="text-align:center; background-color:#fbb;"
| 65 || June 17 || Twins || 7–8 || Hawkins (3–7) || Rapp (2–5) || Trombley (8) || Fenway Park || 31,446 || 37–28 || L1
|- style="text-align:center; background-color:#fbb;"
| 66 || June 18 || Rangers || 1–4 || Morgan (7–5) || Portugal (3–6) || Zimmerman (1) || Fenway Park || 31,427 || 37–29 || L2
|- style="text-align:center; background-color:#bfb;"
| 67 || June 19 || Rangers || 7–4 || Cho (1–0) || Clark (3–7) || Wakefield (4) || Fenway Park || 31,950 || 38–29 || W1 
|- style="text-align:center; background-color:#bfb;"
| 68 || June 20 || Rangers || 5–2 || P. Martínez (13–2) || Glynn (0–2) || Wakefield (5) || Fenway Park || 31,501 || 39–29 || W2
|- style="text-align:center; background-color:#bfb;"
| 69 || June 21 || Rangers || 5–4 || Wasdin (7–0) || Helling (6–7) || Wakefield (6) || Fenway Park || 27,627 || 40–29 || W3
|- style="text-align:center; background-color:#fbb"
| 70 || June 22 || @ Orioles || 3–5 || Rhodes (3–2) || Guthrie (0–1) || Timlin (9) || Camden Yards || 43,329 || 40–30 || L1
|- style="text-align:center; background-color:#bfb"
| 71 || June 23 || @ Orioles || 5–0 || Saberhagen (3–2) || Guzmán (3–6) || — || Camden Yards || 45,086 || 41–30 || W1 
|- style="text-align:center; background-color:#bfb"
| 72 || June 24 || @ Orioles || 2–1 || Portugal (4–6) || Mussina (9–4) || Wakefield (7) || Camden Yards || 47,388 || 42–30 || W2
|- style="text-align:center; background-color:#bfb"
| 73 || June 25 || White Sox || 6–1 || Cho (2–0) || Snyder (7–6) || — || Fenway Park || 31,097 || 43–30 || W3
|- style="text-align:center; background-color:#bfb"
| 74 || June 26 || White Sox || 17–1 || P. Martínez (14–2) || Baldwin (3–8) || Wasdin (2) || Fenway Park || 32,758 || 44–30 || W4
|- style="text-align:center; background-color:#fbb"
| 75 || June 27 || White Sox || 6–7 || Simas (2–2) || Wakefield (3–7) || — || Fenway Park || 30,627 || 44–31 || L1
|- style="text-align:center; background-color:#bfb;"
| 76 || June 28 || White Sox || 14–1 || Saberhagen (4–2) || Sirotka (6–8) || — || Fenway Park || 24,616 || 45–31 || W1
|- style="text-align:center; background-color:#fbb;"
| 77 || June 30 || Devil Rays || 10–11 (10)|| Hernández (1–3) || Wasdin (7–1) || — || Fenway Park || 27,961 || 45–32 || L1
|-

|- style="text-align:center; background-color:#fbb;"
| 78 || July 1 || Devil Rays || 3–12 || Álvarez (4–5) || Cho (2–1) || — || Fenway Park || 29,270 || 45–33 || L1
|- style="text-align:center; background-color:#bfb"
| 79 || July 2 || @ White Sox || 6–1 || P. Martínez (15–2) || Parque (8–6) || — || Comiskey Park || 23,226 || 46–33 || W1
|- style="text-align:center; background-color:#fbb"
| 80 || July 3 || @ White Sox  || 2–11 || Sirotka (7–8) || Rose (4–1) || — || Comiskey Park || 18,028 || 46–34 || L1
|- style="text-align:center; background-color:#bfb"
| 81 || July 4 || @ White Sox  || 5–2 || Saberhagen (5–2) || Navarro (6–7) || Wakefield (8) || Comiskey Park || 16,495 || 47–34 || W1
|- style="text-align:center; background-color:#bfb;"
| 82 || July 5 || @ Devil Rays || 4–2 || Portugal (5–6) || Rekar (5–4) || Wakefield (9) || Tropicana Field || 21,967 || 48–34 || W2
|- style="text-align:center; background-color:#fbb;"
| 83 || July 6 || @ Devil Rays  || 4–6 || Lopez (1–1) || Wasdin (7–2) || Hernández (23) || Tropicana Field || 17,309 || 48–35 || L1
|- style="text-align:center; background-color:#fbb;"
| 84 || July 7 || @ Devil Rays || 2–3 || Eiland (1–4) || P. Martínez (15–3) || Hernández (24) || Tropicana Field || 20,959 || 48–36 || L2
|- style="text-align:center; background-color:#fbb"
| 85 || July 8 || @ Devil Rays || 2–3 || Witt (5–5) || Rose (4–2) || Hernández (25) || Tropicana Field || 21,160 || 48–37 || L3
|- style="text-align:center; background-color:#bfb"
| 86 || July 9 || @ Braves || 5–4 || Saberhagen (6–2) || Chen (0–1) || Wakefield (10) || Turner Field || 49,636 || 49–37 || W1 
|- style="text-align:center; background-color:#fbb"
| 87 || July 10 || @ Braves || 1–2 (11)|| Seánez (5–0) || Wasdin (7–3) || — || Turner Field || 47,871 || 49–38 || L1
|- style="text-align:center; background-color:#fbb"
| 88 || July 11 || @ Braves  || 1–8 || Maddux (10–5) || Cho (2–2) || — || Turner Field || 46,680 || 49–39 || L2
|- style="text-align:center; background-color:#bfb"
| 89 || July 15 || Phillies || 6–4 || Rose (5–2) || Byrd (11–6) || Wakefield (11) || Fenway Park || 32,397 || 50–39 || W1
|- style="text-align:center; background-color:#fbb"
| 90 || July 16 || Phillies || 4–5 || Person (3–4) || Saberhagen (6–3) || Gomes (13) || Fenway Park || 32,899 || 50–40 || L1
|- style="text-align:center; background-color:#fbb"
| 91 || July 17 || Phillies || 3–11 || Wolf (5–0) || Portugal (5–7) || — || Fenway Park || 32,228 || 50–41 || L2
|- style="text-align:center; background-color:#bfb;"
| 92 || July 18 || Marlins || 11–9 || Lowe (1–2) || Núñez (3–3) || Wakefield (12) || Fenway Park || 30,288 || 51–41 || W1
|- style="text-align:center; background-color:#fbb;"
| 93 || July 19 || Marlins || 7–10 || Meadows (7–10) || Ohka (0–1) || Alfonseca (4) || Fenway Park || 23,282 || 51–42 || L1
|- style="text-align:center; background-color:#bfb;"
| 94 || July 20 || Marlins || 7–1 || Rose (6–2) || Hernández (5–9) || — || Fenway Park || 25,346 || 52–42 || W1
|- style="text-align:center; background-color:#fbb;"
| 95 || July 21 || Orioles || 1–6 || Mussina (13–4) || Saberhagen (6–4) || — || Fenway Park || 33,690 || 52–43 || L1
|- style="text-align:center; background-color:#fbb;"
| 96 || July 22 || Orioles || 2–5 || Erickson (6–8) || Cho (2–3) || Timlin (10) || Fenway Park || 33,384 || 52–44 || L2
|- style="text-align:center; background-color:#fbb"
| 97 || July 23 || @ Tigers || 5–14 || Moehler (8–9) || Ohka (0–2) || — || Tiger Stadium || 35,245 || 52–45 || L3
|- style="text-align:center; background-color:#bfb"
| 98 || July 24 || @ Tigers || 11–4 || Portugal (6–7) || Weaver (6–6) || Lowe (5) || Tiger Stadium || 37,149 || 53–45 || W1
|- style="text-align:center; background-color:#fbb"
| 99 || July 25 || @ Tigers || 1–9 || Mlicki (5–10) || Rose (6–3) || — || Tiger Stadium || 34,959 || 53–46 || L1
|- style="text-align:center; background-color:#bfb"
| 100 || July 27 || @ Blue Jays || 11–9 || Guthrie (1–1) || Halladay (7–4) || Wakefield (13) || SkyDome || 38,631 || 54–46 || W1
|- style="text-align:center; background-color:#bfb"
| 101 || July 28 || @ Blue Jays || 8–0 || Rapp (3–5) || Hamilton (3–6) || — || SkyDome || 36,190 || 55–46 || W2
|- style="text-align:center; background-color:#fbb"
| 102 || July 30 || Yankees || 3–13 || Irabu (8–3) || Portugal (6–8) || — || Fenway Park || 33,777 || 55–47 || L1
|- style="text-align:center; background-color:#bfb"
| 103 || July 31 || Yankees || 6–5 || Lowe (2–2) || Mendoza (4–7) || — || Fenway Park || 33,179 || 56–47 || W1
|-

|- style="text-align:center; background-color:#bfb"
| 104 || August 1 || Yankees || 5–4 || Saberhagen (7–4) || Hernández (12–7) || Wakefield (13) || Fenway Park || 33,553 || 57–47 || W2
|- style="text-align:center; background-color:#fbb"
| 105 || August 2 || Indians || 5–7 || Karsay (8–1) || Garcés (0–1) || Jackson (23) || Fenway Park || 33,218 || 57–48 || L1
|- style="text-align:center; background-color:#fbb"
| 106 || August 3 || Indians || 4–5 || Shuey (7–4) || Wakefield (3–8) || Jackson (24) || Fenway Park || 33,650 || 57–49 || L2
|- style="text-align:center; background-color:#bfb"
| 107 || August 4 || Indians || 7–2 || Portugal (7–8) || Colón (10–4) || — || Fenway Park || 33,282 || 58–49 || W1
|- style="text-align:center; background-color:#fbb;"
| 108 || August 5 || @ Angels || 0–8 || Finley (6–10) || Rose (6–4) || — || Edison Field || 26,175 || 58–50 || L1
|- style="text-align:center; background-color:#bfb;"
| 109 || August 6 || @ Angels || 5–1 || Saberhagen (8–4) || Sparks (5–8) || — || Edison Field || 36,360 || 59–50 || W1
|- style="text-align:center; background-color:#bfb;"
| 110 || August 7 || @ Angels || 14–3 || Rapp (4–5) || Belcher (5–7) || — || Edison Field || 36,577 || 60–50 || W2
|- style="text-align:center; background-color:#bfb;"
| 111 || August 8 || @ Angels || 9–3 || P. Martínez (16–3) || McDowell (0–4) || — || Edison Field || 31,664 || 61–50 || W3
|- style="text-align:center; background-color:#fbb;"
| 112 || August 9 || @ Royals || 2–5 || Suppan (7–6) || Portugal (7–9) || — || Kauffman Stadium || 18,248 || 61–51 || L1
|- style="text-align:center; background-color:#bfb;"
| 113 || August 10 || @ Royals || 9–6 (10)|| Wakefield (4–8) || Wakefield (6–7) || Garcés (1) || Kauffman Stadium || 15,909 || 62–51 || W1
|- style="text-align:center; background-color:#bfb;"
| 114 || August 11 || @ Royals || 9–3 || Saberhagen (9–4) || Rosado (7–9) || — || Kauffman Stadium || 15,157 || 63–51 || W2
|- style="text-align:center; background-color:#bfb;"
| 115 || August 13 || Mariners || 11–6 || Lowe (3–2) || Fassero (4–14) || — || Fenway Park || 33,653 || 64–51 || W3
|- style="text-align:center; background-color:#bfb;"
| 116 || August 14 || Mariners || 13–2 || P. Martínez (17–3) || Halama (9–4) || — || Fenway Park || 33,258 || 65–51 || W4
|- style="text-align:center; background-color:#fbb"
| 117 || August 15 || Mariners || 3–4 || Meche (4–2) || Portugal (7–10) || Mesa (25) || Fenway Park || 32,460 || 65–52 || L1
|- style="text-align:center; background-color:#bfb"
| 118 || August 16 || Athletics || 6–5 || Lowe (4–2) || Jones (3–5) || — || Fenway Park || 30,597 || 66–52 || W1
|- style="text-align:center; background-color:#fbb"
| 119 || August 17 || Athletics || 1–12 || Heredia (10–5) || Saberhagen (9–5) || — || Fenway Park || 31,246 || 66–53 || L1
|- style="text-align:center; background-color:#bfb"
| 120 || August 18 || Athletics || 7–4 || Garcés (1–1) || Appier (12–10) || Lowe (6) || Fenway Park || 32,405 || 67–53 || W1
|- style="text-align:center; background-color:#fbb"
| 121 || August 19 || Athletics || 2–6 || Hudson (8–1) || P. Martínez (17–4) || Mathews (3) || Fenway Park || 33,393 || 67–54 || L1
|- style="text-align:center; background-color:#fbb"
| 122 || August 20 || @ Rangers || 3–4 || Loaiza (6–1) || Portugal (7–11) || Wetteland (34) || The Ballpark in Arlington || 35,036 || 67–55 || L2
|- style="text-align:center; background-color:#fbb"
| 123 || August 21 || @ Rangers || 2–9 || Helling (10–7) || Rose (6–5) || — || The Ballpark in Arlington || 45,641 || 67–56 || L3
|- style="text-align:center; background-color:#fbb;"
| 124 || August 22 || @ Rangers || 0–6 || Sele (14–7) || Wakefield (4–9) || — || The Ballpark in Arlington || 28,099 || 67–57 || L4
|- style="text-align:center; background-color:#bfb;"
| 125 || August 23 || @ Twins || 4–1 || Rapp (5–5) || Hawkins (8–11) || Lowe (7) || Metrodome || 14,331 || 68–57 || W1
|- style="text-align:center; background-color:#bfb;"
| 126 || August 24 || @ Twins || 7–1 || P. Martínez (18–4) || Ryan (0–1) || — || Metrodome || 12,332 || 69–57 || W2
|- style="text-align:center; background-color:#fbb"
| 127 || August 25 || @ Twins || 3–6 || Radke (10–12) || Portugal (7–12) || — || Metrodome || 11,185 || 69–58 || L1
|- style="text-align:center; background-color:#bfb"
| 128 || August 27 || Angels || 4–3 || Garcés (2–1) || Percival (3–3) || Lowe (8) || Fenway Park || 32,921 || 70–58 || W1
|- style="text-align:center; background-color:#bfb;"
| 129 || August 28 || Angels || 7–6 || Lowe (5–2) || Pote (0–1) || — || Fenway Park || 33,060 || 71–58 || W2
|- style="text-align:center; background-color:#bfb;"
| 130 || August 29 || Angels || 7–4 || Rapp (6–5) || Belcher (5–8) || Lowe (9) || Fenway Park || 32,253 || 72–58 || W3
|- style="text-align:center; background-color:#bfb;"
| 131 || August 30 || Royals || 9–1 || P. Martínez (19–4) || Suppan (8–8) || — || Fenway Park || 32,705 || 73–58 || W4
|- style="text-align:center; background-color:#bfb;"
| 132 || August 31 || Royals || 6–3 || Garcés (3–1) || Witasick (5–11) || Lowe (10) || Fenway Park || 32,177 || 74–58 || W5
|-

|- style="text-align:center; background-color:#bfb;"
| 133 || September 1 || Royals || 4–3 || Mercker (7–5) || Rosado (7–13) || Beck (8) || Fenway Park || 31,743 || 75–58 || W6
|- style="text-align:center; background-color:#fbb;"
| 134 || September 2 || Royals || 2–4 || Suzuki (1–4) || R. Martínez (0–1) || Fussell (1) || Fenway Park || 31,387 || 75–59 || L1
|- style="text-align:center; background-color:#fbb;"
| 135 || September 3 || @ Mariners || 1–2 || Moyer (13–6) || Lowe (5–3) || — || Safeco Field || 44,471 || 75–60 || L2
|- style="text-align:center; background-color:#bfb;"
| 136 || September 4 || @ Mariners || 4–0 || P. Martínez (20–4) || Abbott (5–2) || — || Safeco Field || 44,597 || 76–60 || W1
|- style="text-align:center; background-color:#bfb;"
| 137 || September 5 || @ Mariners || 9–7 || Garcés (4–1) || Paniagua (6–11) || Lowe (11) || Safeco Field || 44,019 || 77–60 || W2
|- style="text-align:center; background-color:#bfb"
| 138 || September 6 ||  @ Mariners || 3–2 || Florie (3–1) || Halama (11–6) || Lowe (12) || Safeco Field || 44,246 || 78–60 || W3
|- style="text-align:center; background-color:#bfb"
| 139 || September 7 || @ Athletics || 5–3 || Wakefield (5–9) || Heredia (11–7) || Lowe (13) || Newtowrk Associates Coliseum || 21,195 || 79–60 || W4
|- style="text-align:center; background-color:#fbb"
| 140 || September 8 || @ Athletics || 2–6 || Appier (14–12) || Rapp (6–6) || — || Newtowrk Associates Coliseum || 20,251 || 79–61 || L1
|- style="text-align:center; background-color:#bfb"
| 141 || September 10 || @ Yankees || 3–1 || P. Martínez (21–4) || Pettitte (12–11) || — || Yankee Stadium || 55,239 || 80–61 || W1
|- style="text-align:center; background-color:#bfb"
| 142 || September 11 || @ Yankees || 11–10 || Garcés (5–1) || Irabu (10–6) || Beck (9) || Yankee Stadium || 55,422 || 81–61 || W2
|- style="text-align:center; background-color:#bfb"
| 143 || September 12 || @ Yankees || 4–1 || Cormier (2–0) || Clemens (12–9) || Beck (10) || Yankee Stadium || 56,028 || 82–61 || W3
|- style="text-align:center; background-color:#fbb"
| 144 || September 13 || @ Indians || 7–11 || Nagy (16–9) || Wakefield (5–10) || Shuey (6) || Jacobs Field || 43,264 || 82–62 || L1
|- style="text-align:center; background-color:#bfb"
| 145 || September 14 || @ Indians || 12–3 || Lowe (6–3) || Gooden (3–4) || — || Jacobs Field || 43,203 || 83–62 || W1
|- style="text-align:center; background-color:#bfb"
| 146 || September 15 || @ Indians  || 6–4 (13)|| Wasdin (8–3) || Brower (1–1) || — || Jacobs Field || 43,224 || 84–62 || W2
|- style="text-align:center; background-color:#bfb;"
| 147 || September 17 || Tigers  || 14–3 || Florie (4–1) || Blair (2–11) || — || Fenway Park || 29,038 || 85–62 || W3
|- style="text-align:center; background-color:#bfb;"
| 148 || September 18 || Tigers || 9–1 || Saberhagen (10–5) || Weaver (8–12) || — || Fenway Park || 32,382 || 86–62 || W4 
|- style="text-align:center; background-color:#bfb;"
| 149 || September 19 || Tigers || 7–3 || Wakefield (6–10) || Mlicki (13–12) || Lowe (14) || Fenway Park || 30,777 || 87–62 || W5 
|- style="text-align:center; background-color:#bfb;"
| 150 || September 21 || Blue Jays  || 3–0 || P. Martínez (22–4) || Hentgen (10–12)  || — || Fenway Park || 27,799 || 88–62 || W6
|- style="text-align:center; background-color:#fbb;"
| 151 || September 22 || Blue Jays  || 9–14 || Escobar (13–11) || Rapp (6–7) || — || Fenway Park || 25,345 || 88–63 || L1
|- style="text-align:center; background-color:#fbb;"
| 152 || September 23 || Blue Jays  || 5–7 || Wells (15–10) || Beck (2–5) || Koch (29) || Fenway Park || 30,780 || 88–64 || L2
|- style="text-align:center; background-color:#fbb"
| 153 || September 24 || Orioles || 0–1 || Mussina (17–7) || Saberhagen (10–6) || Timlin (27) || Fenway Park || 32,930 || 88–65 || L3
|- style="text-align:center; background-color:#bfb"
| 154 || September 25 || Orioles || 4–1 || R. Martínez (1–1) || Linton (1–3) || Garcés (2) || Fenway Park || 32,107 || 89–65 || W1
|- style="text-align:center; background-color:#fbb"
| 155 || September 26 || Orioles || 5–8 || Johnson (8–7) || Wakefield (6–11) || Orosco (1) || Fenway Park || 32,115 || 89–66 || L1
|- style="text-align:center; background-color:#bfb"
| 156 || September 27 || Orioles || 5–3 || P. Martínez (23–4) || Erickson (15–12) || Lowe (15) || Fenway Park || 33,477 || 90–66 || W1
|- style="text-align:center; background-color:#bbb"
| — || September 28 || @ White Sox  || colspan=8|Postponed (rain). Makeup date September 29.
|- style="text-align:center; background-color:#039"
| 157 || September 29 (1) || @ White Sox || 6–2 || Mercker (8–5) || Parque (9–15) || — || Comiskey Park || — || 91–66 || W2
|- style="text-align:center; background-color:#fbb"
| 158 || September 29 (2) || @ White Sox || 2–4 || Foulke (3–3) || Gordon (0–2) || Howry (26) || Comiskey Park || 12,974 || 91–67 || L1
|- style="text-align:center; background-color:#fbb"
| 159 || September 30 || @ White Sox || 2–5 || Lowe (4–1) || Rose (6–6) || Howry (27) || Comiskey Park || 12,788 || 91–68 || L2
|- style="text-align:center; background-color:#bfb"
| 160 || October 1 || @ Orioles || 6–2 || Ohka (1–2) || Linton (1–4) || — || Camden Yards || 43,081 || 92–68 || W1
|- style="text-align:center; background-color:#bfb"
| 161 || October 2 || @ Orioles || 8–0 || R. Martínez (2–1) || Johns (6–4) || — || Camden Yards || 48,338 || 93–68 || W2
|- style="text-align:center; background-color:#bfb"
| 162 || October 3 || @ Orioles || 1–0 || Rose (7–6) || Timlin (3–9) || Wakefield (15) || Camden Yards || 47,567 || 94–68 || W3
|-

|Reference:

 Postseason game log 

|- style="text-align:center; background:#fbb;"
| 1  || October 6 || @ Indians || 2–3 || Shuey (1–0) || Lowe (0–1)  || — || Jacobs Field || 45,182 || 0–1 || L1
|- style="text-align:center; background:#fbb;"
| 2  || October 7 || @ Indians || 1–11 || Nagy (1–0) || Saberhagen (0–1) || — || Jacobs Field || 45,184 || 0–2 || L2
|- style="text-align:center; background:#bfb;"
| 3  || October 9 || Indians || 9–3 || Lowe (1–1) || Wright (0–1) || — || Fenway Park || 33,539 || 1–2 || W1
|- style="text-align:center;  background:#bfb;"
| 4  || October 10 || Indians || 23–7 || Garcés (1–0) || Colón (0–1) || — || Fenway Park || 33,898 || 2–2 || W2 
|- style="text-align:center;  background:#bfb;"
| 5  || October 11 || @ Indians || 12–8 || P. Martínez (1–0) || Shuey (1–1) || — || Jacobs Field || 45,114 || 3–2 || W3 
|- style="text-align:center; style="background-color:#009900;"
|colspan="11" |Red Sox Win Series 3–2|-

|- style="text-align:center; background:#fbb;"
| 1 || October 13 || @ Yankees || 3–4 || Rivera (1–0) || Beck (0–1)  || — || Yankee Stadium || 57,181 || 0–1 || L1
|- style="text-align:center; background:#fbb;"
| 2 || October 14 || @ Yankees || 2–3 || Cone (1–0) || R. Martínez (0–1) || Rivera (3) || Yankee Stadium || 57,180 || 0–2 || L2
|- style="text-align:center; background:#bfb;"
| 3 || October 16 || Yankees || 13–1 || P. Martínez (2–0) || Clemens (1–1) || — || Fenway Park || 33,190 || 1–2 || W1
|- style="text-align:center; background:#fbb;"
| 4 || October 17 || Yankees || 2–9 || Pettitte (2–0) || Saberhagen (0–2) || Rivera (4) || Fenway Park || 33,856 || 1–3 || L1
|- style="text-align:center; background:#fbb;"
| 5 || October 18 || Yankees || 1–6 || Hernández (2–0) || Mercker (0–1) || Mendoza (1) || Fenway Park || 33,589 || 1–4 || L2
|- style="text-align:center; style="background-color:#009900;"
|colspan="11" |Red Sox Lose Series 1–4'''
|-

Awards and honors 
 Nomar Garciaparra – AL Player of the Month (May)
 Pedro Martínez – American League Cy Young Award, AL Pitcher of the Month (April, May, June, September)

All-Star Game
 Nomar Garciaparra, starting SS
 Pedro Martínez, starting P
 José Offerman, reserve 2B

Farm system 

The Augusta GreenJackets replaced the Michigan Battle Cats as the Red Sox' Class A affiliate.

VSL cooperative was with the Chicago Cubs and Cincinnati Reds.

Source:

References

External links 
 1999 Boston Red Sox team page at Baseball Reference
 1999 Boston Red Sox season at Baseball Almanac
 1999 Boston Red Sox Division Series Program

Boston Red Sox seasons
Boston Red Sox
Boston Red Sox
Red Sox